NFL is a 1989 football video game, developed by Atlus and published by LJN exclusively for the Nintendo Entertainment System.

Gameplay modes

This game was the first since NFL Football - released in 1979 for the Intellivision - to get an official National Football League license. Intending to loosely represent the 1988-89 season of the National Football League, the game uses the teams and play formations of that particular era while avoiding usage of the players' names, due to a lack of an NFLPA license, which was given to Tecmo's Tecmo Bowl.

The player could play one of four options, either Interconference, AFC and NFC game or the Super Bowl (specifically Super Bowl XXIII). Along with the option to choose a package to play during the game, players can directly control the entire team at once. This game was one of the first NFL video games on a gaming system. The game employs a Top-Down system for the actual gameplay and allows players to assign handicaps to a human opponent that is not equally skilled as they are.

Reception
Allgame gave the game a 2.5 out of 5 rating in their overview.

References

1989 video games
Video games developed in Japan
LJN games
Atlus games
National Football League video games
Nintendo Entertainment System games
Nintendo Entertainment System-only games
North America-exclusive video games
Professional football games set in the United States
Top-down video games
Video games scored by Hirohiko Takayama
Video games set in 1988
Multiplayer and single-player video games